McComas is an unincorporated community in Mercer County, West Virginia, United States.

An early variant name was Mora.

Notable person
Mike Hodge (1947–2017), actor (Law & Order) and former President of SAG-AFTRA New York local; born in McComas.

References

Unincorporated communities in Mercer County, West Virginia
Unincorporated communities in West Virginia
Coal towns in West Virginia